The 2017 WAFU Cup of Nations (also referred to as Ghana 2017) was an association football tournament that took place in September 2017 in Ghana.

Sixteen teams from West Africa participated. The tournament was the first featuring national teams to be arranged by Fox Sports as part of a twelve year partnership between the broadcaster and the West Africa national football associations union.

Originally, one of the two host cities was set to be Sekondi-Takoradi however the local organising committee changed it to Elmina due to "structural defects at the Sekondi-Takoradi Stadium and the danger it could pose to fans during the tournament".

Participants

WAFU Zone A

WAFU Zone B

Squads

Draw

The draw was held on 27 July at Labadi Beach Hotel in Accra. Teams were ranked using the June 2017 FIFA Rankings. Ghana were given the highest ranking due to being competition hosts.

The four highest ranked national teams from WAFU Zones A and B were seeded meaning they could not be drawn against each other.

Matches
 All times listed are GMT.

First round

Zone A

Zone B

Second round

Group 1

Group 2

Knockout stage

Semi-finals

Third-place playoff

Final

Goalscorers
3 goals

 Stephen Sarfo
 Victorien Adebayor

2 goals

 Vincent Antigah
 Winful Cobbinah
 Kwame Kizito
 Abdoulaye Camara
 Moussa Kone
 Idrissa Halidou
 Rabiu Ali
 Moses Peter

1 goal

 Jules Elegbede
 Rodrigue Fassinou
 Charbel Gomez
 Ibrahim Ogoulola
 Agnide Osseni
 Nabil Yarou
 Hassamy Sansan Dah
 Samuel Sarfo
 Sekou Keita
 Gilson Correia
 Mandala Konte
 Samba Cheikh
 Hinsa Issoufou
 Boubacar Hainikoye Soumana
 Anthony Okpotu
 Moses Okoro
 Ablaye Diene
 Moussa Djitte
 Mohammed Kane
 Assane Mbodj
 Amadu Dia Ndiaye

Awards

Player of the tournament
 Isaac Twum

Golden boot

 Stephen Sarfo

Golden Glove
 Ikechukwu Ezenwa

Best XI

The team of the tournament was announced on 27 September 2017.

Prize money
The prize was awarded in form of US dollars:

References

WAFU Nations Cup
2017 in African football
2017
Wafu
WAFU Cup of Nations